"Headfirst for Halos" is the sixth track and third single from My Chemical Romance's debut album, I Brought You My Bullets, You Brought Me Your Love. It is also their third overall single.  The cover of the single was seen in the "old school" (or, as the video is called on YouTube, "Version 1") music video for the song "I'm Not Okay (I Promise)", featured on the album Three Cheers for Sweet Revenge. The song peaked at number 80 in the UK. The single has been released on CD format as well as a limited press on 7" vinyl.

Track listing

Song meaning
The song is about depression and contemplating suicide. The lyrics, "Now the red ones make me fly, and the blue ones help me fall" may refer to antidepressants or other drugs ("Reds & Blues" in particular is drug slang for the color of commonly abused amphetamine & barbiturate pills respectively, uppers & downers). According to lead vocalist Gerard Way, "This song is about suicide - don't do it."

The band stated in their 2006 documentary Life on the Murder Scene that the song had been originally conceived as a joke and wasn't supposed to be on the album. However, in realizing the potential the song would present to the band artistically, it eventually made the album. Gerard expressed that the group needed the challenge to prove that they could succeed as a band. In 2006, Frank stated in an interview that it was his favorite song to play live.

Charts

Release history

References

2002 singles
My Chemical Romance songs
Songs about suicide
Songs about loneliness
Songs about drugs
Songs written by Gerard Way
2002 songs